Adama Barro (born 3 September 1996) is a Burkinabé international footballer who plays for Rahimo FC, as a midfielder.

Career
He has played club football for RC Bobo Dioulasso and Rahimo FC.

He made his international debut for Burkina Faso in 2015.

References

1996 births
Living people
Burkinabé footballers
Burkina Faso international footballers
RC Bobo Dioulasso players
Rahimo FC players
Association football midfielders
21st-century Burkinabé people
Burkina Faso A' international footballers
2018 African Nations Championship players